Personnel Psychology is a quarterly peer-reviewed scientific journal covering personnel psychology. It was established in 1948 and is published by John Wiley & Sons. The editor-in-chief is Zhen Zhang (Southern Methodist University). According to the Journal Citation Reports, the journal has a 2020 impact factor of 7.073.

References

External links

Personnel psychology journals
Quarterly journals
Wiley (publisher) academic journals
English-language journals
Publications established in 1948